Air Marshal Rajesh Kumar, PVSM, AVSM, VM, ADC is a former officer in the Indian Air Force. He last served as the Commander-in-Chief, Strategic Forces Command. He assumed office on 31 January 2021 following the retirement of Air Marshal Navkaranjit Singh Dhillon. Previously he served as AOC-in-C in Central Air Command and SASO in Eastern Air Command. He superannuated on 31 August 2021.

Early life and education 
Kumar is an alumnus of Mayo College, Ajmer and National Defence Academy, Khadakwasla. He is a graduate from Air Command and Staff College at Montgomery, Alabama. He has also undergone the Higher Defence Management Course at the College of Defence Management at Secunderabad.

Career 
Kumar was commissioned into the fighter stream of the Indian Air Force on 4 June 1982. He has commanded a fighter aircraft squadron and a front-line air base. He is a category A flying instructor, instrument rating instructor and an air crew examiner. His other appointments include team leader of project monitoring team for AWACS project in Israel, director of the Indian Air Force project management team at Aeronautical Development Agency, Bangalore and Senior Air Staff Officer of Eastern Air Command, Shillong.

Awards and medals 
During 36 years of his career, Kumar has been awarded the Param Vishisht Seva Medal in 2021, Ati Vishisht Seva Medal in 2019, and the Vayu Sena Medal for gallantry in operation parakram.

Personal life 
Rajesh Kumar is married to Jaya Kumar. They have 2 sons.

References 

Living people
Indian Air Force air marshals
Year of birth missing (living people)
Recipients of the Ati Vishisht Seva Medal
Recipients of the Vayu Sena Medal
National Defence Academy (India) alumni
Recipients of the Param Vishisht Seva Medal
College of Defence Management alumni